Shelbyville State Fish and Wildlife Area is an Illinois state park on  in Moultrie County, Illinois, United States.  It covers part of the watershed of Lake Shelbyville.

References

State parks of Illinois
Protected areas of Moultrie County, Illinois